Borys Chambul (born February 17, 1953) is a retired discus thrower, who represented Canada at the 1976 Summer Olympics. He won the gold medal in the men's discus throw event at the 1978 Commonwealth Games.

References
 

1953 births
Living people
Canadian male discus throwers
Athletes (track and field) at the 1976 Summer Olympics
Athletes (track and field) at the 1978 Commonwealth Games
Athletes (track and field) at the 1979 Pan American Games
Pan American Games track and field athletes for Canada
Commonwealth Games gold medallists for Canada
Olympic track and field athletes of Canada
Athletes from Toronto
Commonwealth Games medallists in athletics
Canadian people of Ukrainian descent
Medallists at the 1978 Commonwealth Games